The men's sport sambo 90 kilograms competition at the 2018 Asian Games in Jakarta was held on 1 September 2018 at the Jakarta Convention Center Assembly Hall.

Schedule
All times are Western Indonesia Time (UTC+07:00)

Results
Legend
DQ — Won by disqualification
SU — Won by submission
WO — Won by walkover

Main bracket

Final

Top half

Bottom half

Repechage

References

External links
Official website

Sambo at the 2018 Asian Games